Payal Manojkumar Kukrani is an Indian politician. She is Member of the Gujarat Legislative Assembly from the Naroda Assembly constituency since December 8, 2022. She is Member of the Bharatiya Janata Party.

References 

Living people
Bharatiya Janata Party politicians from Gujarat
Gujarat MLAs 2022–2027
People from Ahmedabad district
1992 births